Devol may refer to:
 Devol (album)
 Devol, a deity in Sinhala Buddhist mythology.

People
 Devol Brett (1923–2010), United States Army Air Forces general who piloted American aircraft during crises and wars from 1948 (the Berlin Crisis) through the Vietnam War (1960s)
Frank Denny De Vol (1911–1999), sometimes known simply as DeVol, was an American arranger, composer and actor
George Devol, inventor (1912–2011), inventor of the first industrial robot
Devon Scott (nickname s Devol; born 1994), American basketball player in the Israel Basketball Premier League

Places
Devol, Oklahoma
Devoll (river) or Devolli, a river in southern Albania
Devol (Albania) or Deabolis, a former Bulgarian and Byzantine fortification on the Devol river
Treaty of Devol, between Bohemund I of Antioch and Byzantine Emperor Alexius I
Devoll District, in the Korçë County of south-eastern Albania
Devoll Hydro Power Plant, a proposed power plant on the Devoll River, in Albania
 Devol (Macedonia) or Devolgrad, Diabolis, a medieval fortress near Kavadarci, present-day Republic of North Macedonia

See also
 Devo (disambiguation)
 Devoll (disambiguation)